Moses Substone Budamba Mudavadi (1923-1989) was an influential politician from Sabatia, Kenya, in the early post-independence years  under former president Daniel Moi. 
 
He was the first patron of the Maragoli Cultural Festival until his death in 1989.
 
His son, Musalia Mudavadi succeeded him as the Sabatia Constituency member of parliament. He was the husband to Hannah Mudavadi

References 
Daily Nation, September 3, 2002: 

1923 births
1989 deaths
Kenyan Luhya people
Members of the National Assembly (Kenya)